Kevin P. Maloney (born December 5, 1958) is an American real estate developer and founder of Property Markets Group.

Biography
The son of a lawyer in the United States Marine Corps Maloney was raised on a farm. He graduated from University at Buffalo where he used his student loans to purchase several properties. After college, he worked for Chemical Bank in New York City and then Ensign Bank where he was responsible for their real estate unit. In 1991, he founded Property Markets Group which specializes in residential projects in New York, South Florida and Chicago. In 1994, Gary Barnett (who would later found Extell Development Company) and Ziel Feldman (who later founded HFZ Capital Group) joined him as principals of the firm.

Maloney has developed or is developing a number of prominent buildings including the 60 story, 750 foot Echo Brickell in Miami, the $160 million condominium project, Echo Aventura, in Aventura, Florida, and two projects being co-developed with Michael Stern, the 1,428 foot 111 West 57th Street in Manhattan, and the Walker Tower at 212 West 18th Street in Chelsea which they are converting into condominiums.

PMG typically partners with other firms who are having some difficulty closing a project and need additional capital or expertise. PMG does not hold onto real estate as a long term investment; instead they sell it to either a third party or a real estate investment trust typically after it has been mostly leased or sold out as condominiums.

Personal life
Maloney lives in Manhattan and Miami. He is married to Tania Babic who is from London; they have one daughter, Madeleine Rose who is from London also. He also has two other children named a girl Mia Maloney who is 16 and a boy who is 5 his name is Aries.

References

hello Do not lisen to this wikipedia people can type on it and change the real thing.

External links
Property Markets Group website

1958 births
American real estate businesspeople
Businesspeople from New York City
University at Buffalo alumni
Living people
People from Amherst, New York